Bertold Paul Wiesner  (1901–1972) was an Austrian Jewish physiologist noted firstly for coining the term 'Psi' to denote parapsychological phenomena; secondly for his contribution to research into human fertility and the diagnosis of pregnancy; and thirdly for being the biological father to upwards of 600 offspring by anonymously donating sperm used by his wife the obstetrician Mary Barton to perform artificial insemination on women at her private practice in the Harley Street area of London.

First marriage and early work in Austria
Wiesner was briefly married to the Austrian author, playwright, and scriptwriter Anna Gmeyner. They had one daughter: the author Eva Ibbotson, born in 1925. The family moved to Scotland in 1926 when Wiesner accepted a post at the University of Edinburgh. Wiesner and Gmeyner separated in 1928. He became a naturalized citizen in 1934.

During 1926 while Wiesner was still in Austria, he began investigating the role of hormones in regulating fertility and their impact on fetal development. Wiesner also researched the possibility of preventing and terminating pregnancy by physiological means without mechanical intervention based on oral ingestion of manufactured substances containing hormones. He presented his first paper at the First International Congress for Sex Research organized by the psychiatrist Albert Moll in Berlin.

Two years later in 1927 the German gynecologists Bernhard Zondek and Selmar Ascheim discovered that the urine of a pregnant woman contained a substance later identified as the gonadotropic hormone human chorionic gonadotropin that caused an estrous reaction when injected into rats. This provided the basis for the Aschheim-Zondek test for pregnancy.

Early work in Scotland

The following year in 1928, Wiesner was appointed to the position of head of Sex Physiology by animal geneticist Francis Crew, Professor of Animal Genetics at the newly established Institute of Animal Genetics (IAG) established within the University of Edinburgh.

A number of notable scientists conducted research at the IAG, including physiologist John Scott Haldane, zoologist Lancelot Hogben and evolutionary biologist Julian Huxley. It was there that Wiesner built upon the work of Zondek and Aschheim by examining the production and role of hormones during fertilization and pregnancy. Zondek and Aschheim had thought that the hormone chorionic gonadotrophin was produced by the pituitary gland. But the research conducted at the IAG proved that it is secreted by the placenta.

In 1929, Wiesner visited Montreal, where he discussed with some scientists the possibility of using medicine derived from female hormones to delay menopause. Later, the scientists helped form the company Ayerst, McKenna and Harrison, Ltd (later, Wyeth) who marketed Premarin, a controversial hormone replacement therapy (HRT) drug based on pregnant mare's urine.

The Pregnancy Diagnosis Station

The work of Wiesner and Crew led to the establishment of the Pregnancy Diagnosis Station at Edinburgh, which by 1939 was conducting ten thousand pregnancy tests per year, serving physicians across the United Kingdom. In addition, Wiesner discovered that analysis of the urine provided by pregnant women could indicate the likelihood of miscarriage and abnormal fetal development.

Artificial insemination research

While at the Institute of Animal Genetics, Wiesner resumed his earlier research into the prevention of pregnancy which contributed to the formulation of a reliable oral contraceptive for women. In addition, Wiesner collaborated with Kenneth Walker, a urological surgeon, at the Royal Northern Hospital where they had success in artificially inseminating women with sperm from anonymous donors in cases where the patient's husband was infertile or impotent.

While working as an obstetrician at the Royal Free Hospital in London during the early 1940s, Mary Barton had also had similar success and founded the first private clinic offering artificial insemination in the United Kingdom. In 1945, Barton collaborated with Wiesner and Walker on a paper for the British Medical Journal, describing their technique of human artificial insemination. The paper precipitated highly publicized condemnation from the Pope who called it a sin, and the Archbishop of Canterbury who called for the British parliament to make human artificial insemination illegal. Although it was not criminalized it was not legalized either and therefore the status of artificial insemination was ambiguous. Consequently, the activities of Barton and Wiesner at the fertility clinic were conducted in secrecy and all inseminated women were instructed to tell nobody about it.

Collaboration and marriage to Mary Barton
Subsequently, Barton and Wiesner jointly managed Barton's practice in London, during which time they married and had a son Jonathan Wiesner in 1945. (They also raised a daughter, Ruth.) From the beginning of Barton's practice until Wiesner's retirement in the mid-late 1960s, Mary Barton successfully inseminated an estimated 1500 women, the majority with sperm provided from Wiesner, some 1-200 from neuroscientist Derek Richter as well as an unknown number from as yet unidentified donors. It is estimated that Wiesner is the biological father of around 600 children born following these procedures, although some believe this figure could be as high as 1000.

Parapsychological research

In addition to his scientific research into fertility and pregnancy, Wiesner was intrigued by parapsychological phenomena, and in 1941, he met the psychologist and parapsychologist Robert Thouless who was President of the Society for Psychical Research in London from 1942 until 1944. Together, Wiesner and Thouless collaborated on constructing a hypothetical model to explain parapsychological phenomena. During this time, Wiesner coined the term 'Psi' to denote extrasensory perception and psychokinesis. Their model, which was not intended to prove or disprove the existence of such phenomena, was first introduced in 1946, as part of a jointly authored paper where Wiesner and Robert Thouless use the term 'Psi' to indicate parapsychological phenomena.

Offspring
In 2007, the son of Weisner and Barton's marriage, Jonathan Weisner, provided saliva and blood from which his DNA was isolated and held on record. Since then, about fifty people have been able to verify that Bertold Paul Wiesner is their biological father through a DNA match to Jonathan Wiesner and to each other. Wiesner's biological offspring, conceived by artificial insemination performed by Mary Barton and confirmed by DNA testing, include author and psychotherapist Paul Newham, barrister David Gollancz, writer Michael Bywater, comedian Simon Evans and film maker Barry Stevens, whose documentary films were instrumental in facilitating and publicizing the process by which Wiesner's offspring can confirm their paternity. In 2018, some of Wiesner's siblings were involved in a participatory action research process to explore their views about genomics research.

See also
Parapsychology
Anna Gmeyner
List of people with the most children

References

1901 births
1972 deaths
Austrian physiologists
Parapsychologists
Sperm donors
Austrian emigrants to Scotland
Austrian Jews
Scottish Jews